Gahnia microcarpa is a tussock-forming perennial in the family Cyperaceae, that is native to parts of New Caledonia.

References

microcarpa
Plants described in 1949
Flora of New Caledonia
Taxa named by André Guillaumin